CX 58 Radio Clarín is a Uruguayan Spanish-language AM radio station that broadcasts from Montevideo.

It specializes in tango music.

References

External links
 RadioClarin

Spanish-language radio stations
Radio in Uruguay
Tango in Uruguay
Mass media in Montevideo
Radio stations established in 1958
1958 establishments in Uruguay